Niwata (written: 庭田) is a Japanese surname. Notable people with the surname include:

, Japanese women's footballer
, Japanese triathlete

Japanese-language surnames